Howard Stidham (born December 17, 1954) is a former American football linebacker who played one season with the San Francisco 49ers of the National Football League. He was drafted by the San Francisco 49ers in the fifteenth round of the 1976 NFL Draft. He played college football at Tennessee Technological University and attended North Hardin High School in Radcliff, Kentucky.

References

External links
Just Sports Stats

Living people
1954 births
Players of American football from Kentucky
American football linebackers
Tennessee Tech Golden Eagles football players
San Francisco 49ers players
People from Radcliff, Kentucky